Horst Schröder (25 February 1938 – 6 April 2022) was a German politician. A member of the Christian Democratic Union of Germany, he served in the Bundestag from 1972 to 1984. He died on 6 April 2022 at the age of 84.

References

1938 births
2022 deaths
Christian Democratic Union of Germany politicians
Members of the Bundestag for Lower Saxony
Members of the Hamburg Parliament
Officers Crosses of the Order of Merit of the Federal Republic of Germany
Politicians from Hamburg
University of Hamburg alumni
University of Kiel alumni
20th-century German politicians
Members of the Bundestag 1972–1976
Members of the Bundestag 1976–1980
Members of the Bundestag 1980–1983
Members of the Bundestag 1983–1987
Members of the Bundestag 1987–1990
Members of the Bundestag 1990–1994